Leonardo Javier Realpe Montaño (born 26 February 2001) is an Ecuadorian footballer who plays as a central defender for Red Bull Bragantino.

Career

Independiente Del Valle
Born in Quinindé, Realpe was an Independiente del Valle. He made his first team debut on 14 July 2019, in a 1–1 away draw against Técnico Universitario.

Red Bull Bragantino
On 10 December 2019, Realpe signed a five-year contract with Red Bull Bragantino.

Career statistics

Club

Notes

Honours

Club
Independiente Del Valle
Copa Sudamericana: 2019

References

2001 births
Living people
Ecuadorian footballers
Ecuadorian expatriate footballers
Association football defenders
C.S.D. Independiente del Valle footballers
Red Bull Bragantino players
Ecuadorian Serie A players
Campeonato Brasileiro Série A players
Ecuadorian expatriate sportspeople in Brazil
Expatriate footballers in Brazil
People from Esmeraldas Province